Tridrepana marginata is a moth in the family Drepanidae. It was described by Watson in 1957. It is found in Yunnan, China.

The wingspan is 27-32.2 mm for males and 30.2–39 mm for females.

References

Moths described in 1957
Drepaninae